Tommy Gubbins (7 July 1907 – 23 September 1976) was an Australian rules footballer who played with Essendon in the Victorian Football League (VFL). Before being recruited by the Bombers, Gubbins played in Williamstown CYMS's 1928 premiership side. After leaving Essendon, he went to Carwarp near Mildura and then Mordialloc in the Federal Football League (FFL) before playing three games with Williamstown in the Victorian Football Association (VFA) in 1936.

Notes

External links 
		

1907 births
1976 deaths
Australian rules footballers from Victoria (Australia)
Essendon Football Club players